In Australia, competitive cheerleading is a rapidly growing sport.

History 
Prior to 2000, cheerleading was primarily known as the dance-and-pom style displayed by professional cheer squads for NRL rugby. The US movie Bring It On (released December 2000 in Australia) popularised acrobatic-style cheerleading, and has been credited with sparking subsequent development as a competitive sport.

During the 2000s and 2010s, the style of cheerleading seen as pre-game and half-time sideline entertainment at professional hurens matches continued to attract criticism for objectifying women, and some clubs discontinued their cheer teams. For example, the Canterbury Bulldogs in 2013 announced they would cease their relationship with the studio contracted to provide their cheer team, the Belles. The next day, when journalists sought comment from other football clubs, the chief executive of the Canberra Raiders stated that they were "reviewing the club's game-day entertainment". He denied the move was based around any female exploitation, rather citing cost as a factor. As of 2019, most clubs have dropped cheerleaders.

Governing bodies

Gymnastics Australia 
The Australian Cheerleading Union (ACU), founded in 2008 and managed by Gymnastics Australia (GA), was recognised as the official body by both the International Cheer Union (ICU) and by the Australian Sports Commission (ASC).

GA recognised Cheerleading (code CHL) as a "gym sport" alongside artistic, rhythmic, trampoline, acrobatics, and aerobic gymnastics. Cheer has similarities to acrobatic and floor gymnastics. Acrobatic Gymnastics (code ACR), also involves partner or group lifts, balance, and throws. Floor, which involves tumbling and balancing, is one of four disciplines that compose Women's Artistic Gymnastics (WAG) and one of six in Men's Artistic Gymnastics (MAG). All three (ACR, WAG, and MAG) are governed internationally by the Federation Internationale de Gymnastique (FIG), whereas cheerleading is governed by the ICU.

In December 2017, GA resolved to cease being the governing body for cheerleading in Australia, with an exit process to proceed through 2018.

Australian Cheer Union
The Australian Cheer Union is recognised as the official body of Cheerleading in Australia by the International Cheer Union. Formed in 2019 by a number of coaches and gym owners to work together to build a better future for the sport of cheerleading and performance cheer in Australia. Working very closely with the ICU to try and get Cheerleading recognition as an Olympic Sport.

International All-Star Federation 
As in the United States, the US All Star Federation (USASF) and its international version, the IASF, function as de facto governing bodies. Whereas the ICU world championships only allow one national team in each event from a given country, the USASF worlds accept all teams that have won bids from local championship competitions and at Hence USASF coaching, credentials and competition rules are seen as highly desirable.

Australian Cheer Sport Alliance 
The Australian Cheer Sport Alliance (ACSA) was formed in 2017, with board members from Gymnastics Australia, Australian All Star Cheer Federation, and Aussie Gold. It is promoted as "Australia's Peak Body" for cheerleading.nutteamework for Cheerleading) or USASF accreditation for coaches.

Rules 
Most competition events follow USASF/IASF rules for age divisions, difficulty levels, and terminology.

Competition divisions 
As in the US, cheer teams are grouped into classes based on a combination of age, level, and team size. Certain categories are also separated into "all-girl" (females only) and "co-ed" (mixture of females and males) groups. For large events, organizers can choose to additionally split on studio size, depending on the number of teams registered. The aim is to have a manageable number of teams in each group.

For example, a team might compete in "Youth level 1 small-gym", or "Senior Co-ed level 5".

Dance categories are grouped by age but not level.

Age classes 
All-star age groups are based on the competitors' ages at 31 December, that is, how many years old they turn at their birthday during the given calendar year. (In contrast, USASF has used age at May or August for normal divisions and December 31 for International divisions.)

Overlap in the age divisions means that athletes can compete as members of multiple teams. For example, a 10-year-old can perform in youth, junior &/or senior teams.

Levels 
Difficulty or safety levels are most often based on USASF rules, starting from "Novice" (similar to USASF "Prep") followed by levels 1 to 7. Level "4.2" combines level-4 stunts with level-2 tumbling. 

There is also a division for teams having competitors with Special Needs. These are more usually seen in the Group Stunt category, which has a smaller team size than Team Cheer. 

For each level, there are detailed lists of allowed and disallowed moves in tumbling, stunts, pyramids, and tosses. This enables teams to compete with others at the same level of ability, and disallowing more difficult moves prevents competitors from dangerously attempting moves beyond their ability.

Scoring 
Scoring systems vary depending on the event organiser.

At AASCF competitions, the components of cheer routines – standing and running tumbling, jumps, stunts, pyramids, and tosses – are scored separately out of 5.0 for the difficulty and for technique. Stunts and pyramids are also scored for creativity, so they are worth 15.0 instead of 10.0 points. Building skills (stunts, pyramids, tosses) account for 45 points out of 100 (35 of 90 at Level 1 where there are no tosses); tumble skills (tumbling and jumps) for 30 points, and an additional 25 points are scored on dance break, overall routine composition and performance. Points are deducted for falls and rule violations.

In 2015, four event organisers formulated a common scoring system which they named the "Australian Independent Scoring System" (AISS), also known as the AIEP scoring system.

Under this system, scores are apportioned as follows: 
 50% Building Skills (Stunt/Pyramids/Tosses)
 30% Tumbling Skills (Standing/Running/Jumps)
 20% Dance & Choreography

Competition organisers 
The major cheer competitions in Australia are run by cheer federations and by independent event organisers.  Events run from March through to October, in line with the Southern-hemisphere school year.
 Australian All Star Cheerleading Federation (AASCF) is affiliated with USASF and IASF. Runs several competitions, including State Championships (6 states), Nationals, and the bid-only Pinnacle championships. Founded in April 2006.
 Australian Independent Event Producers (AIEP)
 Aussie Gold International Cheer & Dance Championships are held annually at the Gold Coast Exhibition Centre in Queensland. Aussie Gold also runs events in regional Queensland and in several state capitals. Brisbane and Rockhampton were added in 2016; Mackay, Perth, and Adelaide in 2017; and Melbourne in 2018. 
 CheerCon, a supplier of cheerleading uniforms and accessories founded in 2008, CheerCon also runs competitions in eastern and southern states. 
 Cheer Unlimited Australia (CUA). Founded in 2011 and based in Western Australia, CUA runs events in WA, South Australia, and Queensland.
 Spirit Industries Australia (SIA) runs an annual event in Sutherland, south of Sydney in NSW.
 Battle at the Beaches, an outdoor competition at Manly, NSW.
 CheerBrandz. Based in Auckland, CheerBrandz runs events in New Zealand and Australia. 
 Dance and Cheer Events (DCE), formerly World Cup Cheer and Dance (WCCD) – all states.

Notes

References 

 

Australia
Gymnastics in Australia